Moyadh Ousseni (born 2 April 1993) is a professional footballer who plays as a goalkeeper for Championnat National 2 club Fréjus Saint-Raphaël. Born in France, he plays for the Comoros national team.

International career
Ousseni made his senior international debut for Comoros in a 2021 FIFA Arab Cup qualification match against Palestine, a 5–1 defeat.

References

External links
 
 Etoile FC Profile

1993 births
Living people
Sportspeople from Fréjus
Comorian footballers
French footballers
Association football goalkeepers
Comoros international footballers
French sportspeople of Comorian descent
ÉFC Fréjus Saint-Raphaël players
Championnat National players
Championnat National 2 players
2021 Africa Cup of Nations players
Footballers from Provence-Alpes-Côte d'Azur